The Guarda Fiscal (Fiscal Guard in English) was a Portuguese special military force, tasked with the border and maritime control of people and goods and the law enforcement, particularly in the fields of taxation and customs.

In time of peace, the Guarda Fiscal was under the authority of the Ministry of Finance. In case of war, the Guarda Fiscal would pass for the authority of the Portuguese Armed Forces, forming combat units that would be used primarily in the border defense.

The Guarda Fiscal was formed on September 17, 1885, based on the Barrier Guards detached from the former Royal Guard of the Police (ancestor of the present National Republican Guard) for the tax and customs service. In 1993, the Guarda Fiscal was dissolved as an independent corps, becoming the Fiscal Brigade of the National Republican Guard (GNR). In 2009, the Fiscal Brigade was divided into the current Fiscal Action and Coastal Control units of the GNR.

See also
 Financial Guard (disambiguation)
 Law enforcement in Portugal
 Law enforcement in Azores
 Law enforcement in Madeira

Defunct law enforcement agencies of Portugal
Defunct gendarmeries
Military units and formations established in 1885
Military units and formations established in 1993
Specialist law enforcement agencies of Portugal